B. Sohanlal was a dance director for Bollywood movies. He was the primary teacher to Bollywood choreographer Saroj Khan.

Personal information

Family Background :

He was born in the early 1920s in Delhi, Rajasthan, the eldest of four brothers and a sister.  He was trained in Kathak from the age of four.  His brother's  B. Hiralal, B. Chinnilal and B. Radhesham were also trained in Kathak. Sohanlal and his family left Jaipur to seek their fortune in the South. He married his wife Mrs. Kantha Sohanlal and settled in Chennai. From this marriage he had four sons and a daughter. He is considered to be the greatest exponent of Kathak - particularly in Hindi Bollywood cinemas, Tamil Film Industry. He encouraged his younger brother B.Hiralal into film choreography. Hiralal later became a popular choreographer in the South and north Indian film industry.
During the same time he started teaching the eminent choreographer Saroj Khan. He kept her in dark about his married life and married her in 1961 at the age 41 when she was just 13 years old. She became pregnant with his child in a year and their son was born. Later, they had another daughter named KuKu. They separated in 1965 as he was not willing to give his name to his kids with Saroj and Saroj single-handedly brought them up.
Sohanlal never encouraged his children into the field of dance in the Bollywood industry rather encouraged them to study as much as they wish and be happy that was his wish till his last date.

The Classic movies choreography :

Some of the best-known films for which he choreographed are as follows: and 
The listed Timeline as time of begin till end:

	
Year Devata (Master B.Sohanlal)

1978 Satyam Shivam Sundaram: Love Sublime (Master B.Sohanlal)

1977 Amaanat (dance director Master B.Sohanlal: south)

1977 Paapi (Master B.Sohanlal)

1976 Maa (choreographer - as Master B.Sohanlal)

1975 Kala Sona (Master B.Sohanlal: South)

1975 Rafoo Chakkar (Master B.Sohanlal)

1975 Do Jasoos (dances - as Master B. Sohanlal)

1974 Naya Din Nai Raat (Master B.Sohanlal)

1973 Bobby (Master B.Sohanlal)

1973 Jwar Bhata (Master B.Sohanlal)

1973 Bandhe Haath (Master B.Sohanlal)

1972 Dastaan (Master B.Sohanlal)

1971 Haré Raama Haré Krishna (Master B.Sohanlal)

1971 Hulchul (dances - as Master B.Sohanlal: South)

1970 Mastana (choreographer: south - as MAster B. Sohanlal)

1970 Kab? Kyoon? Aur Kahan? (choreographer: south - as Master B. Sohanlal)

1970 Ganwaar (dances - as Master B. Sohanlal: South)

1969 Ek Phool Do Mali (Master B.Sohanlal: South)

1968 Kismat (Master B.Sohanlal)

1967 Jewel Thief (choreographer - as Master B. Sohanlal: South)

1967 Anita (choreographer - as Master B. Sohanlal)

1967 Chimukala Pahuna (Master B.Sohanlal)

1966 Dillagi (choreographer - as William & Master B.Sohanlal)

1966 Gaban (choreographer - as Master B. Sohanlal)

1966 Mera Saaya (choreographer - as Master B. Sohanlal: South)

1966 Phool Aur Patthar (Master B.Sohanlal)

1965 Guide (Master B.Sohanlal)

1965 Arzoo (choreographer - as Master B. Sohanlal)

1965 Kaajal (dances - as Master B. Sohanlal)

1965 Saheli (choreographer - as Master B. Sohanlal)

1964 Ayee Milan Ki Bela (choreographer - as Master B. Sohanlal)

1964 Ishaara (choreographer - as Master B. Sohanlal: South)

1964 Mr. X in Bombay (Master B.Sohanlal)

1963 Dil Hi To Hai (choreographer - as Master B. Sohanlal)

1963 Mere Mehboob (dance - as Master B.Sohenlal)

1963 Nartakee (dances - as Master B. Sohanlal: South)

1963 Parasmani (Master B.Sohanlal)

1963 Pyar Ka Bandhan (Master B.Sohanlal)

1963 Taj Mahal (dances Master B.Sohanlal: south)

1962 Aashiq (Master B.Sohanlal)

1962 Sahib Bibi Aur Ghulam (Master B.Sohanlal)

1961 Chaudhvin Ka Chand (Master B.Sohanlal)

1961 Aas Ka Panchhi (choreographer - as B. Sohanlal)

1961 Nazrana (Master B.Sohanlal)

1961 Passport (choreographer - as B. Sohan Lal)

1960 Dil Apna Aur Preet Parai (dance director - as Master B.Sohanlal)

1960 Dil Bhi Tera Hum Bhi Tere (dance director - as B. Sohanlal)

1960 Kalpana (choreographer - as Master B.Sohanlal)

1960 Love in Simla (cMaster B.Sohanlal)

1959 Main Nashe Men Hoon (dances)

1959 Ujala (dances - as Master B.Sohanlal)

1958 Dilli Ka Thug (choreographer - as Master B.Sohanlal)

1958 Madhumati (choreographer - as Master B.Sohanlal)

1958 Criminal (Master B.Sohanlal)

1958 Sadhna (Master B.Sohanlal)

References

External links
http://www.imdb.com/name/nm0812241/ B. Sohanlal's IMDB page listing the films on which he worked.
https://web.archive.org/web/20080905132045/http://desi-galaxy.sabza.org/2008/02/26/the-life-of-a-dancer/ Saroj Khan feature describing her early history with B.Sohanlal

1920s births
Possibly living people
Indian film choreographers
People from Jaipur
Indian choreographers